Siva Manasula Sakthi also known by the initialism SMS, is a 2009 Indian Tamil-language romantic comedy film written and directed by debutant M. Rajesh, a former assistant of director S. A. Chandrasekhar. It stars Jiiva and newcomer Anuya Bhagwat, a student of Film and Television Institute of India, with Santhanam, Urvashi and Sathyan appearing in supporting and Arya appearing in a cameo role. The film was later remade in Telugu as Siva Manasulo Sruthi and released in 2012.

Plot 
Siva and Sakthi meet on a train from Coimbatore and strike up a friendship. Siva introduces himself as an army officer and Sakthi as an air hostess. The two part ways on arrival in Chennai, but Siva promises to meet her soon. He pays a visit to the airline company where Sakthi claimed to work, with his mother Kalyani and best friend Vivek tagging along. When asking for Sakthi, they are instead greeted by another woman with the same name. Siva realizes that he has been tricked.

In reality, Siva is a courier deliveryman and Sakthi, a radio jockey. When they learn of each other's deception, they swear to get revenge on each other. A series of humorous incidents happen as Siva teases Sakthi live on her radio show and gets her in trouble with her father; and she retaliates by tattling on him to his family and using him as a driver. When Siva defeats a handful of goons in a tough fight to save Sakthi's brother Shanmugam and helps organize his marriage, Sakthi develops genuine feelings for him.

She reveals her feelings by planning a surprise birthday party for Siva, but learns that he had lied about his birth date. Humiliated in front of his family, she leaves angry and bitter. Siva learns of her true feelings for him and attempts to reconcile with her, but she ignores him. Siva grows upset as well, fights with his mother and sister, and continuously destroys Vivek's new mobile phones (they forgive him eventually). However at one point when he visits her office, he is drunk and misbehaves with the people around. He tells Sakthi's assistant to call Sakthi, but the latter, enraged upon Siva's behaviour, sends a man to beat him up and throw him out. Siva loses all his love and care for Sakthi.

Some time later, Sakthi's father arranges for her to meet a prospective groom Arun. Siva coincidentally runs into Arun and is introduced as Sakthi's "close friend". He proceeds to tell Arun about all her good qualities, never mentioning anything negative. Sakthi, realising his true love, leaves Arun and asks Siva to marry her. He is still angry about the time she sent a man to beat him up and because he believed she accepted Arun. She apologises and Siva forgives, but he asks her to go to a nearby temple where they can get married the next day. She visits the temple early the next day, but Siva does not visit, calling her up and saying that he "refuses" to marry her. Disappointed, Sakthi returns home, but sees that Siva organised a surprise birthday party for her. The two of them sleep together that night. The following morning he plays another prank on her; she realizes that he will never take any relationship seriously and runs away from him.

Some months later, Siva arrives at Sakthi's house with his family, to formally ask for her hand in marriage. During this time, Sakthi faints and is revealed to be pregnant (as a result of sleeping with Siva). When both their families learn this, they humorously surround Siva and beat him up. As the credits roll, a scene set two years later reveals that Siva and Sakthi are married and have a son, to whom Siva brags about how he successfully "got the girl".

Cast 
 Jiiva as Siva
 Anuya Bhagwat as Sakthi
 Santhanam as Vivek
 Urvashi as Kalyani (Siva's mother)
Sneha Murali as Viji (Siva's sister)
 G. Gnanasambandam as Sakthi's father
 Sathyan as Shanmugam (Sakthi's brother)
 Mahanadi Shankar as police inspector (guest appearance)
 Arya as Arun (guest appearance)
 Shakeela as Sakthi (Cameo appearance)
 Anandsami as Sakthi's RJ Friend

Production
Rajesh approached Jai to work on the film, while he was still working on Subramaniapuram (2008). Jai could not accept the film owing to the different look that he was sporting for his look in the other film, and requested Rajesh do move ahead without him, despite the director's willingness to wait.

Accolades

Soundtrack 

The soundtrack, composed by Yuvan Shankar Raja, released on 25 January 2009, featuring 7 tracks with lyrics written by Na. Muthukumar was highly appreciated by fans and critics. The album grew in popularity, with particularly the song "Oru Kal" getting widely noticed, whilst also garnering accolades and several awards and nominations for its composer Yuvan Shankar Raja and its lyricist Na. Muthukumar. Yuvan had worked for 20 days on the re-recording at a state-of-the-art recording studio in Malaysia. During this time, he also composed an additional song "Oru Paarvaiyil" which was added in the soundtrack. The songs "Oru Kal" and "Oru Paarvaiyil" were reused in the Telugu version Shiva Manasulo Shruti, though credits were not given.

References

External links 
 

2009 films
2009 romantic comedy films
2000s Tamil-language films
Films scored by Yuvan Shankar Raja
Indian romantic comedy films
Tamil films remade in other languages
2009 directorial debut films
Films directed by M. Rajesh